The Northwestern League was a professional sports league in minor league baseball that operated from 1905 to 1917. It was represented by teams based in British Columbia, Montana, Oregon and Washington. The league became the Pacific Coast International League in 1918.

Teams
21 teams played in the league throughout its existence. Those teams include the: Aberdeen Black Cats (1905, 1917), Bellingham Gillnetters (1905), Everett Smokestackers (1905), Spokane Indians (1905–1917), Vancouver Horse Doctors (1905, 1907), Victoria Legislators (1905), Butte Miners (1906–1908, 1916–1917), Grays Harbor Lumbermen (1906), Tacoma Tigers (1906–1917), Seattle Siwashes (1907–1908), Grays Harbor Grays (1908–1909), Vancouver Beavers (1908—1911, 1914, 1916–1917), Portland Colts (1909, 1912—1914), Seattle Turks (1909), Seattle Giants (1910—1917), Portland Pippins (1911), Victoria Bees (1911–1915), Vancouver Champions (1912, 1915), Vancouver Bees (1913), Ballard Pippins (1914), a Great Falls, Montana team (1916) and Great Falls Electrics (1917).

League champions
For most of the league's history, there were no official playoffs following the regular season — in fact, 1915 was the only season in which a playoff was played. Therefore, the team that finished in first place was often the de facto league champion.

The Everett Smokestackers were the league's first champions, finishing in first place in the four team league in 1905. In 1906, the Tacoma Tigers finished in first place and in 1907 the Aberdeen Black Cats took the crown. The Vancouver Beavers finished in first place in 1908 and again in 1911 and 1914, the Seattle Turks in 1909 and the Spokane Indians in 1910. In 1912, the Seattle Giants were first, while in 1913 the Vancouver Bees finished on top.

In 1915, the league played its only official playoff, which matched the first-place Seattle Giants against the second-place Tacoma Tigers. The Giants won the playoff three games to two, though it was presumably supposed to be at least a seven-game series - however, the playoff was abandoned during game six when a dispute broke out.

The Spokane Indians finished in first place in 1916 and the Great Falls Electrics finished in first place in 1917.

Cities represented 1905—1917 
Aberdeen, WA: Aberdeen Black Cats 1907, 1915; Aberdeen Grays 1908–1909 
Aberdeen, WA & Hoquiam, WA: Grays Harbor Grays 1906 
Ballard, WA: Ballard Pippins 1914 
Bellingham, WA: Bellingham Yankees 1905 
Butte, MT: Butte Miners 1906–1908, 1916–1917 
Everett, WA: Everett Smokestackers 1905 
Great Falls, MT: Great Falls Electrics 1916–1917 
Portland, OR: Portland Colts 1909, 1912—1914; Portland Pippins 1911 
Seattle, WA: Seattle Siwashes 1907–1908; Seattle Turks 1909; Seattle Giants 1910–1917 
Spokane, WA: Spokane Indians 1905–1917 
Tacoma, WA: Tacoma Tigers 1906–1917 
Vancouver, BC: Vancouver Horse Doctors 1905, 1907; Vancouver Beavers 1908–1911, 1914, 1916–1917; Vancouver Champions 1912, 1915; Vancouver Bees 1913; 
Victoria, BC: Victoria Legislators 1905; Victoria Bees 1911–1915

Standings & statistics 
1905 Northwestern League
schedule pt 1 - pt 2 
  Victoria (14—38) moved to Spokane July 11. The season was shortened to September 11. Playoffs: None. The first—half finished in a tie and it was decided that if Everett won the second—half, the championship would be awarded to Everett. Everett won the second—half.

1906 Northwestern League
schedule
Grays Harbor represented Aberdeen—Hoquiam, Washington. 

1907 Northwestern League
schedule<
 

1908 Northwestern League 
schedule 
 

1909 Northwestern League
schedule
 

1910 Northwestern League
schedule
 

1911 Northwestern League
schedule
 

1912 Northwestern League 
schedule

1913 Northwestern League
schedule 
 

1914 Northwestern League
schedule
Portland (36—60) moved to Ballard July 20.
  
1915 Northwestern League
schedule
 Victoria and Aberdeen withdrew with league permission, August 1. Playoff: Seattle 3 games, Tacoma 2; abandoned when the sixth game broke up in a dispute. 
 
1916 Northwestern League
schedule
 
 
1917 Northwestern League
schedule
 The season was shortened to July 15 with National Association approval.

Baseball Hall of Fame alumni 
Dave Bancroft, 1913 Portland Colts 
Stan Coveleski, 1913–1914 Spokane Indians 
Harry Heilmann, 1913 Portland Colts 
George Kelly, 1914–1915 Victoria Bees 
Joe McGinnity, 1913–1915 Tacoma Tigers; 1916–1917 Butte Miners; 1917 Great Falls Electrics

References
Baseball Reference

Baseball in Oregon
Sports leagues established in 1905
Sports leagues disestablished in 1917
1905 establishments in the United States
Baseball leagues in Montana
Baseball leagues in Oregon
Baseball leagues in Washington (state)
Defunct minor baseball leagues in the United States
Defunct baseball leagues in Canada